Xandres Vervloesem (born 13 May 2000) is a Belgian former cyclist, who competed as a professional for UCI WorldTeam  from 2021 to 2022.

Major results

2017
 2nd Overall Ain Bugey Valromey Tour
1st Young rider classification
1st Stage 5
 3rd Overall Aubel–Thimister–La Gleize
1st Young rider classification
1st Mountains classification
1st Stage 3
 8th Overall Tour du Pays de Vaud
2018
 2nd E3 Harelbeke Junioren
 3rd Overall GP Général Patton
 4th Overall Giro della Lunigiana
 4th Overall Oberösterreich Juniorenrundfahrt
1st Mountains classification
 5th Gent–Wevelgem Juniors
 5th Nokere Koerse voor Juniores
 9th Road race, UEC European Junior Road Championships
 9th Trofeo Emilio Paganessi
2020
 1st  Overall Ronde de l'Isard
1st Young rider classification

References

External links

2000 births
Living people
Belgian male cyclists
Cyclists from Antwerp Province